James William Fowler III (1940–2015) was an American theologian who was Professor of Theology and Human Development at Emory University. He was director of both the Center for Research on Faith and Moral Development, and the Center for Ethics until he retired in 2005. He was a minister in the United Methodist Church. Fowler is best known for his book Stages of Faith, published in 1981, in which he sought to develop the idea of a developmental process in "human faith".

Life and career
Fowler was born in Reidsville, North Carolina, on October 12, 1940, the son of a Methodist minister. In 1977, Fowler was appointed Associate Professor of Theology and Human Development at the Candler School of Theology at Emory University. He was later named Charles Howard Candler Professor of Theology and Human Development. He died on October 16, 2015.

Stages of faith
He is best known for his book Stages of Faith (1981), in which he sought to develop the idea of a developmental process in "human faith".

These stages of faith development were along the lines of Jean Piaget's theory of cognitive development and Lawrence Kohlberg's stages of moral development.

In the book, Fowler describes 6 stages of development.

Description of the stages

 Stage 0 – "Primal or Undifferentiated" faith (birth to 2 years), is characterized by an early learning of the safety of their environment (i.e. warm, safe and secure vs. hurt, neglect and abuse). If consistent nurture is experienced, one will develop a sense of trust and safety about the universe and the divine. Conversely, negative experiences will cause one to develop distrust about the universe and the divine. Transition to the next stage begins with integration of thought and language which facilitates the use of symbols in speech and play.
 Stage 1 – "Intuitive-Projective" faith (ages of three to seven), is characterized by the psyche's unprotected exposure to the Unconscious, and marked by a relative fluidity of thought patterns. Religion is learned mainly through experiences, stories, images, and the people that one comes in contact with.
 Stage 2 – "Mythic-Literal" faith (mostly in school children), is characterized by persons have a strong belief in the justice and reciprocity of the universe, and their deities are almost always anthropomorphic. During this time metaphors and symbolic language are often misunderstood and are taken literally.
 Stage 3 – "Synthetic-Conventional" faith (arising in adolescence; aged 12 to adulthood), is characterized by conformity to authority and the religious development of a personal identity. Any conflicts with one's beliefs are ignored at this stage due to the fear of threat from inconsistencies.
 Stage 4 – "Individuative-Reflective" faith (usually mid-twenties to late thirties), is a stage of angst and struggle. The individual takes personal responsibility for his or her beliefs and feelings. As one is able to reflect on one's own beliefs, there is an openness to a new complexity of faith, but this also increases the awareness of conflicts in one's belief.
 Stage 5 – "Conjunctive" faith (mid-life crisis), acknowledges paradox and transcendence relating reality behind the symbols of inherited systems. The individual resolves conflicts from previous stages by a complex understanding of a multidimensional, interdependent "truth" that cannot be explained by any particular statement.
 Stage 6 – "Universalizing" faith, or what some might call "enlightenment". The individual would treat any person with compassion as he or she views people as from a universal community, and should be treated with universal principles of love and justice.

Empirical research
Fowler's model has inspired a considerable body of empirical research into faith development, although little of such research was ever conducted by Fowler himself.  A useful tool here has been Gary Leak's Faith Development Scale, or FDS, which has been subject to factor analysis by Leak.
For criticism see Developmental approaches to religion.

Publications
Stages of Faith: The Psychology of Human Development and the Quest for Meaning (1981) 
Becoming Adult, Becoming Christian: Adult Development and Christian Faith (1984) (revised 1999 )
To See the Kingdom: The Theological Vision of H. Richard Niebuhr (1974), 
Faith Development and Pastoral Care (1987) 
Weaving the New Creation: Stages of Faith and the Public Church (1991) 
Faithful Change: The Personal and Public Challenges of Postmodern Life (1996)

See also
Jean Piaget, Theory of cognitive development
Erik Erikson, Erikson's stages of psychosocial development
Lawrence Kohlberg, Kohlberg's stages of moral development 
Developmental psychology
Developmental stage theories
Psychology of religion
Integral theory (Ken Wilber)

References

Footnotes

Bibliography

Further reading

External links
James W.Fowler page at Emory Center for Ethics
A synopsis of Fowler's Stages of Faith Consciousness
Craig R. Dykstra "Transformation in Faith and Morals"  Theology Today 39(1)
James Fowler's Stages of Faith in Profile 

2015 deaths
20th-century American psychologists
Emory University faculty
Writers from Georgia (U.S. state)
1940 births
Psychologists of religion
Stage theories
American United Methodist clergy
Duke University alumni
Drew University alumni
Harvard Divinity School alumni